Lobelia rarifolia is a small herbaceous plant in the family Campanulaceae native to Western Australia.

It blooms between September and December producing blue flowers.

The species is found on plains, lateritic ridges and damp flats in the South West, Wheatbelt, Great Southern and Goldfields-Esperance regions of Western Australia where it grows in sandy-clay-loam soils.

References

rarifolia
Flora of Western Australia
Plants described in 1948